The following is a list of pipeline accidents in the United States in 2021. It is one of several lists of U.S. pipeline accidents. See also list of natural gas and oil production accidents in the United States.

Incidents 
This is not a complete list of all pipeline accidents. For natural gas alone, the Pipeline and Hazardous Materials Safety Administration (PHMSA), a United States Department of Transportation agency, has collected data on more than 3,200 accidents deemed serious or significant since 1987.

A "significant incident" results in any of the following consequences:

 fatality or injury requiring in-patient hospitalization
 $50,000 or more in total costs, measured in 1984 dollars
 liquid releases of five or more barrels (42 US gal/barrel)
 releases resulting in an unintentional fire or explosion

PHMSA and the National Transportation Safety Board (NTSB) post incident data, and results of investigations, into accidents involving pipelines that carry a variety of products, including natural gas, oil, diesel fuel, gasoline, kerosene, jet fuel, carbon dioxide, and other substances. Occasionally pipelines are repurposed to carry different products.

 On February 16, a gas pipeline exploded and burned near Monument, New Mexico. There were no injuries.
 On March 5, CenterPoint Energy employees were excavating a gas pipeline in Harris County, Texas when the line ruptured, causing a gas explosion and fire. 7 employees were injured.
 On March 16, 2021, Buckeye Partner’s 12-inch hazardous liquid pipeline Line 602 ruptured and released approximately 14,800 gallons of unleaded gasoline in Linden, New Jersey. Gasoline entered a swamp near the Arthur Kill River.
 At approximately 7:25 pm EDT on June 26, TGP’s 24-inch Tennessee Gas Pipeline ruptured and reportedly released approximately 11,000 MCF of natural gas in West Bloomfield, New York. There was no fire or injuries.
 On June 28, during a pipeline pig run, two people were killed and two were injured at Atmos Energy in Collin County, Texas. An investigation found that a leak on a mainline valve and improper procedures caused the accident.
 On July 22, a natural gas transmission pipeline exploded & burned in Ellsworth County, Kansas. There were no injuries reported.
 On August 15, an El Paso Natural Gas gas transmission pipeline exploded and burned in Coolidge, Arizona. 2 people were killed and another was seriously burned.
 On October 23, a bulldozer operator hit a gas line, at a shopping center under construction in Brenham, Texas. This resulted in a fire engulfing the bulldozer. The bulldozer operator was airlifted to a hospital with burns.
 On December 27, a leak was detected on a 16 inch pipeline, in St. Bernard Parish, Louisiana. About 350,000 gallons of low sulfur diesel were spilled. That section of pipe had corrosion thinning, and, the leak detection system for the pipeline did not fully indicate a leak.

References

Lists of pipeline accidents in the United States
2021 disasters in the United States